Wang Wenjing (born 14 July 1973) is a Chinese gymnast. She competed in six events at the 1988 Summer Olympics.

References

1973 births
Living people
Chinese female artistic gymnasts
Olympic gymnasts of China
Gymnasts at the 1988 Summer Olympics
Place of birth missing (living people)